Encroachment is to advance beyond proper limits, and may refer to:

 Temporal encroachment
 Structural encroachment
 Encroachment (gridiron football), a penalty in American and Canadian football
Encroachment by human populations on natural spaces that causes habitat fragmentation or habitat destruction